Hashvid (also Romanized as Ḩashvīd, Khashvīd, Hashbed, Hāshvīt, and Hāshwet) is a village in Chalanchulan Rural District, Silakhor District, Dorud County, Lorestan Province, Iran. At the 2006 census, its population was 210, in 46 families.

References 

Towns and villages in Dorud County